The Renard R.17 was a Belgian four-seat cabin monoplane designed and built by Constructions Aéronautiques G. Renard. The high cantilever wing was an unusual feature when most contemporary aircraft still had braced wings. Designed as a high-speed transport for fresh flowers, no aircraft were ordered and the only R.17 was retained by the company until 1946.

Specifications

References

Further reading
 

1930s Belgian civil utility aircraft
R.17
High-wing aircraft
Aircraft first flown in 1931